The 1976 Jacksonville State Gamecocks football team represented Jacksonville State University as a member of the Gulf South Conference (GSC) during the 1976 NCAA Division II football season. Led by third-year head coach Clarkie Mayfield, the Gamecocks compiled an overall record of 6–4 with a mark of 6–2 in conference play, and finished third in the GSC.

Schedule

References

Jacksonville State
Jacksonville State Gamecocks football seasons
Jacksonville State Gamecocks football